Kwaku Alston is an American photographer. His editorial work has been featured in The New York Times Magazine, Rolling Stone, Time, Men’s Health, Essence, and Men’s Journal, among many others. He has photographed ads for a wide range of clients, including Coca-Cola, BlackBerry, Target, and Verizon. He has also photographed President Barack Obama & First Lady Michelle Obama on several occasions, including for Essence. Alston is based in Venice, California, and is represented by foureleven agency.

References

External links
Official site
Official blog
/Photography Agent
Time magazine photo essay, "Master of the Portrait: Kwaku Alston," 2006
Kodak Closeup video interview
“Special Inauguration Week Exhibition: Portraits of President Obama and the Obama Family by Kwaku Alston,” Shauna Lee Lange Arts Advisory, January 16, 2009
Video of Kwaku Alston photographing Oprah Winfrey’s Legends Weekend

Living people
American photographers
Artists from Philadelphia
Year of birth missing (living people)